Luzsky (masculine), Luzskaya (feminine), or Luzskoye (neuter) may refer to:
Luzsky District, a district of Kirov Oblast, Russia
Luzskoye Urban Settlement, a municipal formation which the Town of Luza in Luzsky District of Kirov Oblast, Russia is incorporated as